Peter Butler (born 10 June 1951) is a British Conservative Party politician.  At the 1992 general election, he became the first Member of Parliament (MP) for the new constituency of North East Milton Keynes, winning the seat with a majority of over 14,000. A former solicitor, he served as a PPS to Kenneth Clarke.

Butler served only one term in Parliament.  At the 1997 election, he lost the seat by only 240 votes to Labour's Brian White.

A Freemason, Butler was Worshipful Master of the Oxford-based Apollo University Lodge 357 from 1992 to 1993.

References

External links 

1951 births
Conservative Party (UK) MPs for English constituencies
Councillors in South East England
English solicitors
Freemasons of the United Grand Lodge of England
Living people
Members of Oxfordshire County Council
People educated at Adams' Grammar School
People from Newport, Shropshire
Politics of Milton Keynes
UK MPs 1992–1997